Leucine-sensitive hypoglycemia of infancy is a type of metabolic disorder. It is inherited in an autosomal dominant fashion. It is rare.

Names
Other names include hypoglycemia leucine-induced; hypoglycemia leucine induced; and familial infantile hypoglycemia precipitated by leucine.

References

Metabolic disorders
Autosomal dominant disorders